Eriopsela quadrana is a moth of the family Tortricidae. It is found in most of Europe (except Iceland, the Iberian Peninsula, Ukraine, and the Balkan Peninsula), east to the eastern part of the Palearctic realm.

The wingspan is about 12–16 mm.The forewings are elongate and the costa is almost straight. The ground colour is whitish-grey, striated with dark fuscous. The costa is posteriorly spotted with dark fuscous .The edge of basal patch is obtusely angulated in the middle. There is a slender dorsally dilated central fascia, and an irregular spot before the termen in middle. Both are rather dark fuscous and distinctly darker dorsally. The hind wings are grey, beneath much suffused with whitish.

Adults are on wing from May to June. They appear in the late afternoon.

The larvae feed on Solidago virgaurea and Succissa pratensis. They fold the leaves upwards and feed within.

References

External links
 Fauna Europaea
 UKmoths

Olethreutinae
Moths described in 1813
Moths of Japan
Moths of Europe
Moths of Asia
Taxa named by Jacob Hübner